Theagenes of Thasos (typically spelled Theogenes before the first century AD) was an Olympian of ancient Greece, famous for his victories.

Background
Son of Timosthenes, Theagenes was renowned for his extraordinary strength and swiftness. Aged nine, he supposedly carried home the bronze statue of a god from the agora, then carried it back again.

As he grew up he became distinguished in every kind of athletic contest, and gained numerous victories at the Olympian, Pythian, Nemean, and Isthmian Games. Altogether he was said to have won 1300 crowns. He gained a victory at Olympia in the 75th Olympiad, 480 BC. (Paus. vi. 6. § 5.) The popular story among the Thasians was that Heracles was his father. Thomas Green claims that in the course of winning 1,406 boxing matches, Theagenes killed "most of his opponents".

Statue and hero-cult

Pausanias relates a story regarding a statue of Theagenes made by Glaucias of Aegina. A man in Thasos had a grudge against Theagenes for his victories, and scourged the statue by way of revenge. One night, the  statue fell upon this man, killing him.

The statue was put on trial for murder, found guilty, and exiled by being thrown  into the  sea, but was later recovered, because  the Oracle of Delphi had declared that the country would remain in a period of barrenness until they restored the statue of Theagenes. Pausanias mentions having seen many statues of Theagenes among both the Greeks and the Barbarians, (vi. 11. § 9.). The statue in Thasos became the focus of  a hero cult and was said to have healing properties.

Legacy
The football club of the island, founded in 1969, bears his name (A.O. Theagenes Thasou, Α.Ο. Θεαγένης Θάσου) and its emblem represents the head of Theagenes.

In modern fiction
The Olympian: A Tale of Ancient Hellas by E.S. Kraay, 
The Pugilist at Rest: stories by Thom Jones, ISBN 0-316-47302-2
 In the 2011 film Warrior (Dir. Gavin O'Connor) Tom Hardy’s character of Tommy Conlon is said to have tried to surpass Theogenes’ record of fighting victories.

Notes

References

Ancient Thasians
5th-century BC Greek people
Ancient Olympic competitors
Ancient Greek runners
Ancient Macedonian athletes
Ancient Greek boxers
Pankratiasts
Greek male boxers